The Unitarian Society was a historic church building located in Fall River, Massachusetts.

History
The church was built in 1835 and added to the National Register of Historic Places in 1982. The church was originally built at the corner of Second and Borden streets. In 1861, it was dismantled and rebuilt on North Main Street.

Samuel Longfellow was ordained and installed as minister of the church in February, 1848. His brother Henry Wadsworth Longfellow furnished the hymn for the ceremony. Samuel Longfellow's ministry in Fall River lasted 3 years.

The church was destroyed by fire on September 2, 1983. It was the oldest church in the city at the time. However, surviving the fire was a Paul Revere bell, one ornate stained glass window, two plaques, a pulpit, and the baptismal font. A new church was later built at the same location, in a new style (see image below).

See also
National Register of Historic Places listings in Fall River, Massachusetts

References

External links
 Unitarian Church in Fall River website

Unitarian Universalist churches in Massachusetts
Churches in Fall River, Massachusetts
Churches on the National Register of Historic Places in Massachusetts
National Register of Historic Places in Fall River, Massachusetts